Iota Draconis (ι Draconis, abbreviated Iota Dra, ι Dra), also named Edasich , is a star in the northern circumpolar constellation of Draco. A visually unremarkable star of apparent magnitude 3.3, in 2002 it was discovered to have a planet orbiting it (designated Iota Draconis b, later named Hypatia).

Nomenclature

ι Draconis (Latinised to Iota Draconis) is the star's Bayer designation. On discovery the planet was designated Iota Draconis b (or Edasich b).

It bore the traditional name Edasich, derived from the Arabic ' of Ulug Beg and the Dresden Globe, or  'Male hyena' by Kazwini, with Eldsich being recorded in the Century Cyclopedia. In 2016, the International Astronomical Union organized a Working Group on Star Names (WGSN) to catalog and standardize proper names for stars. The WGSN's first bulletin of July 2016 included a table of the first two batches of names approved by the WGSN; which included Edasich for this star.

In July 2014 the International Astronomical Union launched NameExoWorlds, a process for giving proper names to certain exoplanets and their host stars. The process involved public nomination and voting for the new names. In December 2015, the IAU announced the winning name was Hypatia for this planet. The winning name was submitted by Hypatia, a student society of the Physics Faculty of the Universidad Complutense de Madrid, Spain. Hypatia was a famous Greek astronomer, mathematician, and philosopher.

Properties
Edasich is larger and more massive than the Sun, with 1.8 times the mass and nearly 12 times the radius. The spectrum matches a stellar classification of K2 III, indicating this is an evolved star that has exhausted the supply of hydrogen at its core and left the main sequence of stars like the Sun. With an expanded outer envelope, this giant star is radiating over 55 times the luminosity of the Sun at an effective temperature of 4,545 K. This temperature gives it an orange hue that is a characteristic of K-type stars. It is rotating at a leisurely rate, with a period of around 434 days. It is about 1.15 billion years old.

In the past Iota Draconis has been suspected of variability. However, the star has been found to have a constant luminosity to within about 0.004 magnitudes. Hence, as of 2010, the variability remains unconfirmed. An excess emission of infrared radiation at a wavelength of 70μm suggests the presence of a circumstellar disk of dust; what astronomers term a debris disk.

Planetary system

The planetary companion discovered in 2002 was the first planet known to orbit a giant star. The habitable zone for this star lies in the range of 6.8–13.5 Astronomical Units, placing this planet well inside. The alignment of this planet's orbit may make it directly detectable via the transit method. Another long-period planet or brown dwarf was discovered in 2021, and the true masses of both planets were measured via astrometry.

References

External links
SIMBAD: HD 137759 -- Variable Star
Extrasolar Planets Encyclopaedia: Notes for star HIP 75458
SolStation: Edasich/Iota Draconis

K-type giants
Draco (constellation)
Draconis, Iota
Draconis, 12
137759
075458
5744
BD+59 1654
Edasich
Planetary systems with two confirmed planets
Circumstellar disks
Suspected variables
J15245578+5857577